Joseph Boyer Jr. (May 30, 1890 – September 2, 1924) was a co-winner of the 1924 Indianapolis 500.

Biography
Boyer was born on May 30, 1890, in St. Louis, Missouri and grew up in Detroit, Michigan, the son of Joe Boyer Senior and Clara Libby. He became wealthy due to his father owning Burroughs Adding Machine Company and Chicago Numatic.

At the 1924 Indianapolis 500, Boyer participated in two different cars during the race. In his original entry (#9), he qualified 4th. On the 109th lap he was relieved. His relief driver went on to race until lap 176, when the car crashed in turn 1. On lap 111, Boyer climbed into the car of Lora Lawrence Corum (#15), driving relief for Corum. Boyer charged to the front of the field, and led the last 24 laps in Corum's car.

Corum and Boyer were scored as "co-winners," the first time in Indy 500 history that designation had been assigned. In three previous Indy 500 races (1911, 1912, 1923), the winner had relief help during the race, but in none of those cases did the relief driver finish the race; the original driver got back behind the wheel to finish those races.

He died on September 2, 1924, from injuries sustained in a crash at Altoona Speedway in Tyrone, Pennsylvania the day before.

Indy 500 results

References

External links

 

1890 births
1924 deaths
Indianapolis 500 drivers
Indianapolis 500 winners
Racing drivers from Detroit
Racing drivers who died while racing
Sports deaths in Pennsylvania
AAA Championship Car drivers